Ringling is a town in Jefferson County, Oklahoma, United States. The population was 1,037 at the 2010 census, a decline of 8.6 percent from the figure of 1,135 in 2000. It was named for John Ringling, the founder of the Ringling Brothers Circus.

History
John Ringling and a partner, Jake Hamon, financed construction of the Oklahoma, New Mexico and Pacific Railway in 1913, to provide transportation to farmers and ranchers between Ardmore and Lawton. Construction began on May 1, 1913, at Ardmore and progressed westward. Oil was discovered in the Healdton field in August 1913. A post office was established during June 1914.

Geography
Ringling is located in eastern Jefferson County at  (34.178094, -97.593182). It is bordered to the south by the town of Cornish.

Oklahoma State Highway 89 (Fifth Street) runs north–south through the center of Ringling.

Demographics
As of the census of 2000, there were 1,135 people, 469 households, and 297 families residing in the town. There were 567 housing units at an average density of 739.9 per square mile (284.3/km2). The racial makeup of the town was 87.40% White, 8.28% Native American, 0.35% Asian, 0.79% from other races, and 3.17% from two or more races. Hispanic or Latino of any race were 1.67% of the population.

There were 469 households, out of which 29.4% had children under the age of 18 living with them, 49.3% were married couples living together, 10.0% had a female householder with no husband present, and 36.5% were non-families. 34.5% of all households were made up of individuals, and 19.4% had someone living alone who was 65 years of age or older. The average household size was 2.33 and the average family size was 2.99.

In the town, the population was spread out, with 25.6% under the age of 18, 7.3% from 18 to 24, 24.1% from 25 to 44, 21.3% from 45 to 64, and 21.7% who were 65 years of age or older. The median age was 38 years. For every 100 females, there were 86.4 males. For every 100 females age 18 and over, there were 83.9 males.

The median income for a household in the town was $19,674, and the median income for a family was $29,219. Males had a median income of $28,333 versus $14,063 for females. The per capita income for the town was $13,003. About 18.8% of families and 24.0% of the population were below the poverty line, including 29.5% of those under age 18 and 17.2% of those age 65 or over.

References

Towns in Jefferson County, Oklahoma
Towns in Oklahoma
Populated places established in 1914